This is a list of mayors of the Chilean commune of La Cisterna, part of Greater Santiago in the Santiago Metropolitan Region.

References

La Cisterna